John Powell is a former Australian rules footballer who played with Collingwood and Fitzroy in the Victorian Football League (VFL).

He is the brother of Australian Olympic canoeist Adrian Powell.

Notes

External links 

1937 births
Australian rules footballers from Victoria (Australia)
Collingwood Football Club players
Fitzroy Football Club players
Living people